Coral plant is a common name for several flowering plants and may refer to:

Balanophora coralliformis in the family Balanophoraceae 
Berberidopsis corallina in the family Berberidopsidaceae
Jatropha multifida, a species of Jatropha in the spurge family, Euphorbiaceae
Russelia equisetiformis in the plantain family, Plantaginaceae